Mohamed Hossain Milzer (born 11 February 1967) is a Bangladeshi sprinter. He competed in the men's 400 metres at the 1988 Summer Olympics.

References

External links
 

1967 births
Living people
Athletes (track and field) at the 1988 Summer Olympics
Bangladeshi male sprinters
Bangladeshi male middle-distance runners
Olympic athletes of Bangladesh
Athletes (track and field) at the 1990 Commonwealth Games
Commonwealth Games competitors for Bangladesh
Place of birth missing (living people)